Franciszek Bohomolec, S.J., Bogoria Coat of Arms (29 January 1720 – 24 April 1784), writing pseudonymously as: Daniel Bobinson, Dzisiejkiewicz, F. B., F. B. S. J., Galantecki, J. U. P. Z., Jeden Zakonnik S. J., Jeden Zakonnik Societatis Jesu, Lubożoński, Ludziolubski, M. Z. S. W., Murmiłowski, N. N., N** N***, Ochotnicki, Odziański, Pokutnicki, Pośrzednicki, Poznajewski, Prożniak nie Tęskniący, Staroświat, Śmiałecki, Szkolnicki, Theosebes, Ucziwski, was a Polish Jesuit teacher, writer, poet, satirist, social commentator, linguist, translator, dramatist and theatrical reformer who was one of the principal playwrights of the Polish Enlightenment. After the Suppression of the Society of Jesus, he continued his usual work and in addition became an editor, publisher and printer.

After completing his studies for the Jesuit priesthood and ordination in Vilnius, he spent two years studying rhetoric in Rome. Bohomolec returned to Warsaw to teach. As well as teaching poetry, he began to adapt the comedies of Carlo Goldoni and Molière for performance by his pupils. His early works satirized the ignorance and folly of the Polish aristocracy. His later plays reached a wider public. They included Małżeństwo z kalendarza ("Marriage by the Calendar", 1766), which ridicules ignorance and superstition and is usually considered his best work, and Czary ("Sorcery", 1775), which also satirises superstition. Pan dobry ("The Good Landowner", 1967) is a social commentary on the relationship between peasants and the gentry. Bohomolec was an habitué of King Stanisław August Poniatowski's weekly Thursday Lunches.

For the last 20 years of his life Bohomolec edited the magazine Monitor, which greatly contributed to the Enlightenment in Poland. It was modelled on the famed English magazines The Tatler and The Spectator and was one of the first modern periodicals in Poland. His works in Latin include a study of Polish vernacular language. A famous anonymous poem of his time, entitled, "Kurdesz", (taken from the Turkish word for 'brother') and addressed to the mayor of Warsaw, is most often attributed to him.

References

External links
 Selected works of Franciszek Bohomolec in the Polona Library Collection

1720 births
1784 deaths
People from Warsaw
Clan of Bogoria
18th-century Polish Jesuits
18th-century Polish–Lithuanian philosophers
18th-century Polish–Lithuanian poets
18th-century Polish–Lithuanian dramatists and playwrights
Enlightenment philosophers
Polish male poets
Polish male dramatists and playwrights
Polish male writers
Polish philanthropists
Polish political writers
Polish satirists
Polish theatre directors
Burials at Powązki Cemetery